William Almer (fl. 1572) of Pant Iocyn, Denbighshire, was a Welsh politician.

Almer was the eldest son of the MP, Edward Almer of Gresford, Denbighshire. He succeeded his father after 1574, inheriting Pant Iocyn (Pant-yr-Ochain) house at Almer, between Gresford and Wrexham..

William was a Justice of the Peace for Denbighshire from 1562 and appointed High Sheriff of Denbighshire for 1586–87. He served as a Deputy Lieutenant of the county from 1587. He was elected a Member (MP) of the Parliament of England for Denbighshire in 1572.

He married Elen, the daughter of Piers Puleston of Hafod y Wern, Wrexham and had one daughter. Pant Iocyn passed to his daughter Jane, who had married Gilbert Gerard.

References

External links
 Pant-yr-Ochain, the chief house in Gresford

Year of birth missing
Year of death missing
Members of the Parliament of England for Denbighshire
16th-century Welsh politicians
Members of the Parliament of England (pre-1707) for constituencies in Wales
High Sheriffs of Denbighshire
Deputy Lieutenants of Denbighshire
English MPs 1572–1583